Sieyic, also spelled Sieyik, is the capital of the Panamanian comarca (indigenous territory) of Naso Tjër Di. It was founded on 4 December 2020, having been separated from the Changuinola District. It is located on the banks of the Teribe River.

References

Populated places in Naso Tjër Di Comarca